Atlantic Express (ICAO: JLM) was an airline operating in Gambia, a country in West Africa. The airline began services on December 16, 2004, from Banjul International Airport in Banjul to Lagos International Airport in Lagos, Nigeria.

History 
The airline was founded in 2004 and started its operations on December 16, 2004.

In March 2005, Acvila Air leased an McDonnell Douglas MD-82 to Atlantic Express Airlines. The aircraft returned to Acvila Air in May 2006.

Destinations 
Atlantic Express Airlines flew to the following destinations:

 Dakar
 Freetown
 Accra
 Lagos
 Conakry
 Monrovia
 Abidjan
 Douala
 Cotonou
 Brazzaville
 Libreville
 Praia
 Ouagadougou

Atlantic Express Airlines also flew to Europe and the United States.

Fleet 
The fleet of Atlantic Express consisted of the following aircraft:

The airline operated Douglas DC-9-32 aircraft, some of which ended up parked at Phoenix Goodyear Airport in 2008.

See also		
 List of defunct airlines of the Gambia
 Transport in the Gambia

References

External links
 Atlantic Express Airlines Photo Archive at airliners.net

Defunct airlines of the Gambia
Airlines established in 2004
Airlines disestablished in 2005